Skapce is a municipality and village in Tachov District in the Plzeň Region of the Czech Republic. It has about 100 inhabitants.

Administrative parts
The village of Zálezly and the hamlet of Krtín are administrative parts of Skapce.

References

Villages in Tachov District